Aurora (Arshaluys) Mardiganian (January 12, 1901 – February 6, 1994) was an Armenian-American author, actress, and a survivor of the Armenian genocide.

Biography
Mardiganian escaped to Tiflis (modern Tbilisi, Georgia), then to St. Petersburg, from where she traveled to Oslo and finally, with the help of Near East Relief, to New York City.

Ravished Armenia (Auction of Souls)

In New York, she was approached by Harvey Gates, a young screenwriter, who helped her write and publish a narrative that is often described as a memoir titled Ravished Armenia (full title Ravished Armenia; the Story of Aurora Mardiganian, the Christian Girl, Who Survived the Great Massacres).

The narrative Ravished Armenia was used for writing a film script that was produced in 1919, Mardiganian playing herself, and first screened in London as the Auction of Souls. The first New York performance of the silent film, entitled Ravished Armenia took place on February 16, 1919, in the ballroom of the Plaza Hotel, with society leaders, Mrs. Oliver Harriman and Mrs. George W. Vanderbilt, serving as co-hostesses on behalf of the American Committee for Armenian and Syrian Relief.

Aurora Mardiganian recalled sixteen young Armenian girls being "crucified" by their Ottoman tormentors. Auction of Souls showed the victims nailed to crosses. However, almost 70 years later Mardiganian revealed to film historian Anthony Slide that the scene was inaccurate: 

Mardiganian was referred to in the press as the Joan of Arc of Armenia, describing her role as the spokesperson for the victims of the horrors that were then taking place in Turkey and the catalyst for the humanist movement in America. In the 1920s Mardiganian married and lived in Los Angeles until her death on February 6, 1994, aged 93.

The animated film Aurora's Sunrise about her life premiered in June 2022. It also includes scenes of the film Auction of Souls and it was Armenias entry to the Academy Awards for 2023.

Aurora prize
In honor of Aurora Mardiganian the Aurora Prize was established by 100 LIVES. The Aurora prize is the vision of Vartan Gregorian, Noubar Afeyan, and Ruben Vardanian.
The Aurora Prize for Awakening Humanity is a humanitarian award founded on behalf of the survivors of the Armenian genocide and in gratitude to their saviors. The prize is awarded in Yerevan, Armenia, to an individual whose actions have – at their personal peril – had an exceptional impact on preserving human life and advancing humanitarian causes.

References

Further reading
 Slide, Anthony. Ravished Armenia and the Story of Aurora Mardiganian. Scarecrow Press, January 1, 1997. , 9780810833111. - Later re-published: Jackson, Ms.: University Press of Mississippi, 2014.

External links

 
 Ravished Armenia
 Aurora Mardiganian's biography

Witnesses of the Armenian genocide
Armenian genocide survivors
Armenians from the Ottoman Empire
American people of Armenian descent
Emigrants from the Ottoman Empire to the United States
20th-century American memoirists
Armenian memoirists
20th-century American women writers
20th-century Armenian women writers
20th-century American actresses
20th-century Armenian actresses
American silent film actresses
Armenian silent film actresses
1901 births
1994 deaths
American women non-fiction writers